Gutzeit is a surname. Notable people with the surname include:

Bruno Gutzeit (born 1966), French swimmer
Tilo Gutzeit (born 1938), German figure skater
Vadim Gutzeit (born 1971), Ukrainian Olympic champion sabre fencer and Ukraine's Youth and Sport Minister
Werner Gutzeit (born 1932), German-Danish cubist painter